St. Isidore Church (Samogitian: Šv. Ėzėduoriaus bažnīče) is a Roman Catholic church in Renavas, Lithuania. It is located near the road Židikai–Seda.

History

The construction of the church started in 1918 after Lithuania re-established its independence. However, after the walls of 2.5 m height were built, the construction stopped. The works began to continue only in 1929 and the construction was completed in 1933. Because of lack of money and in order to finish the project, constructors of the church refused exterior decoration foreseen in the primary projects. Consequently, the outside walls were made only of concrete.

The Church was consecrated on 12 June 1933 by the first bishop of Telšiai Justinas Staugaitis. 

Current parson of the Renavas parish is a priest Dainoras Židackas who also serves as the priest of St. John the Baptist Church, Židikai.

The Church is rectangle with a small tower and a porch.

External links

MKE.lt
panoramos.lt

References

Roman Catholic churches in Telšiai County
Buildings and structures in Telšiai County
Roman Catholic churches completed in 1933
Tourist attractions in Telšiai County
20th-century Roman Catholic church buildings in Lithuania